The 2016–17 season is Hyderabad cricket team's 83rd competitive season. The Hyderabad cricket team and Hyderabad women's cricket team are senior men's and women's domestic cricket teams based in the city of Hyderabad, India, run by the Hyderabad Cricket Association. They represent the state of Telangana in domestic competitions.

Competition Overview

Senior Men's team

Squads
 Head coach: Bharat Arun
 Assistant coach : Zakir Hussain
 Fielding Coach : C Dayanand
 Physio : Prasanth Panchada
 Trainer : Naveen Reddy
 Video analyst : Vinay Elkaturi
 
S Badrinath moved from the Tamil Nadu to lead the Hyderabad while Hanuma Vihari and Dwaraka Ravi Teja moved from the Hyderabad to the Andhra ahead of the 2016–17 season. The Hyderabad team also got the new coach with Bharat Arun replacing Abdul Azeem.

Irani Cup
Mohammad Siraj got selected for Rest of India squad for 2016-17 Irani Cup, a first-class cricket competition in India.

Syed Mushtaq Ali Trophy
Tanmay Agarwal and Chama Milind got selected for South Zone squad for 2016-17 Syed Mushtaq Ali Trophy, a domestic Twenty20 (T20) cricket tournament in India.

Deodhar Trophy
Chama Milind got selected for India B squad for 2016-17 Deodhar Trophy, a List A cricket competition in India.

Indian Premier League
Chama Milind was retained by Delhi Daredevils while local franchise, SunRisers Hyderabad picked Tanmay Agarwal and Mohammad Siraj in the IPL Auction for 2017 Indian Premier League season.

Buchi Babu Tournament
Hyderabad was invited for 2016–17 Kalpathi AGS - Buchi Babu Invitational Tournament, invitational tournament conducted annually by Tamil Nadu Cricket Association in the honour of M. Buchi Babu Naidu and began their campaign against Baroda at Chennai on 5 August 2016. They finished inside top-2 with two wins and a loss in Group B to advance to knockout stage but lost to TNCA Presidents XI in semifinal by 24 runs.

Points Table
Group B

Matches
Group Stage

Semi-final

Statistics
Most runs

 Source: 
Most wickets

 Source:

Ranji Trophy

Hyderabad began their campaign in Ranji Trophy, the premier first-class cricket tournament in India, against Goa at Nagpur on 6 October 2016. They finished inside top-2 of Group C with four wins, three draws and a loss to advance to knockout stage and get promoted to Group A/B for 2017-18 Ranji Trophy. They were eliminated in Quarter-finals where Mumbai defeated Hyderabad by 30 runs.

Points table
Group C

Knockout stage

Matches
Group Stage

Quarter-final

Statistics
Most runs

 Source: Cricinfo
Most wickets

 Source: Cricinfo

Inter State Twenty-20 Tournament

Hyderabad began their campaign in the tournament against Goa at Velachery on 29 January 2017. This tournament performances were used to select the zonal teams for 2016-17 Syed Mushtaq Ali Trophy. They finished in third in South Zone with three wins and two losses.

Points Table
South Zone

Matches
Zonal Stage

Statistics
Most runs

 Source: Cricinfo
Most wickets

 Source: Cricinfo

Vijay Hazare Trophy

Hyderabad began their campaign in Vijay Hazare Trophy, a List A cricket tournament in India, against Jammu & Kashmir at Kolkata on 25 February 2017. They finished in third in Group D with four wins and two losses.

Points Table
Group D

Matches
Group Stage

Statistics
Most runs

 Source: Cricinfo
Most wickets

 Source: Cricinfo

Senior Women's team

Squads
 Head coach: Purnima Rao 
 Assistant coach: Nooshin Al Khadeer
 Assistant coach: Savita Nirala 
 Physio : Harsha Ganwal
 Trainer : M Shalini
 Video analyst : Aarti Nalge

Senior women's cricket inter zonal three day game
Arundhati Reddy, D Ramya, Himani Yadav, Ananya Upendran, Gouher Sultana and Sravanthi Naidu got selected for South Zone squad for 2016-17 Senior women's cricket inter zonal three day game, a Women's First-class cricket tournament in India.

One-Day League

Hyderabad began their campaign in Senior women's one day league, Women's List A cricket tournament in India, against Maharashtra at Raipur on 1 October 2016. They finished in fourth in Elite Group A with a win and two losses while the match against Goa was abandoned.

Points Table
Elite Group A

 Top two teams advanced to Super League. 
 Bottom team relegated to 2017-18 Plate Group.

Matches
Group Stage

Statistics
Most runs

 Source: BCCI
Most wickets

 Source: BCCI

T20 League

Hyderabad began their campaign in Senior Women's T20 League, a Women's Twenty20 cricket tournament in India, against Madhya Pradesh at Jamshedpur on 2 January 2017. They finished inside top-2 in Elite Group-B with three wins and a loss to advance to Super League. They finished as Runners-up of the tournament after finishing second in Super League with a win and two losses.

Points Table

Elite Group B

 Top two teams advanced to Super League. 
 Bottom team relegated to 2017-18 Plate Group.

Elite Super League

 Champions. 
 Runners-up.

Matches
Group Stage

Super League Stage

Statistics
Most runs

 Source: BCCI
Most wickets

 Source: BCCI

See also
Hyderabad cricket team 
Hyderabad women's cricket team 
Hyderabad Cricket Association

References

External links
Hyderabad cricket team official site

Cricket in Hyderabad, India
Cricket in Telangana
Sport in Telangana